Merochlorophaeic acid is a depside with the molecular formula C24H30O8 which has been isolated from the lichen Cladonia merochlorophaea.

References

Further reading 

 
 

Polyphenols
Carboxylic acids
Phenol esters
Methoxy compounds